Mosby (also Half-Breed Crossing) is a tiny unincorporated community in southwestern Garfield County, Montana, United States. It lies along Highway 200 southwest of the town of Sand Springs, its nearest neighboring settlement. Although Mosby has had no post office since 2015, it still has a separate ZIP code of 59058. As of 2015, there is an RV park where the gas station was; and there is a church, but no other businesses or services. 

The Mosby Dome Cat Creek Oil Field is in this area.

History
Originally known as Baldwin, this town takes its name from the area’s first settler, who arrived in 1891. 
Mosby had a post office that opened on June 29, 1904, was moved on February 18, 1983, and closed on July 30, 2015 
There was a gas station and repair shop open from 1950 to 1983.

Climate
According to the Köppen Climate Classification system, Mosby has a semi-arid climate, abbreviated "BSk" on climate maps.

References

Unincorporated communities in Garfield County, Montana
Unincorporated communities in Montana